Mary A. Olson (born May 23, 1958) is a Minnesota (US) politician and a former member of the Minnesota Senate who represented District 4, which includes portions of Beltrami, Cass, Crow Wing, Hubbard and Itasca counties in the northern part of the state. A Democrat, she was first elected in 2006. On November 2, 2010, she lost her re-election bid to the Republican John Carlson.

Olson was a member of the Senate's Commerce & Consumer Protection Committee and Judiciary Committee. She also served on the Finance subcommittees for the Economic Development and Housing Budget Division and the Health and Human Services Budget Division, and on the Judiciary
Judiciary Subcommittee for Data Practices, which she chaired.

Olson received a B.A. from the University of North Dakota and earned a J.D. from their law school. Prior to her election to the Senate, she was the assistant county attorney for Crow Wing County, and also as an attorney for the United States Air Force at March Air Force Base. Her great-great-grandfather, Peter A. Gandrud, was also a member of the Minnesota Legislature. She and her husband, John, have four children.

Electoral history

References

External links

Senator Olson web page
Minnesota Public Radio Votetracker: Senator Mary Olson

1958 births
Living people
People from Willmar, Minnesota
Military personnel from Minnesota
American Lutherans
Democratic Party Minnesota state senators
University of North Dakota alumni
Women state legislators in Minnesota
21st-century American politicians
21st-century American women politicians